Judith Warringa (born 22 March 1965) is a Dutch former professional tennis player.

She has career-high WTA rankings of 327 in singles, achieved on 5 February 1990, and 365 in doubles, reached on 5 January 1987. 

Playing for Netherlands at the Fed Cup, Warringa has a win–loss record of 3–0.

ITF finals

Singles: 6 (1–5)

Doubles: 3 (1–2)

References

External links 
 

1965 births
Living people
Dutch female tennis players
20th-century Dutch women
21st-century Dutch women